Al-Malik al-Mas‘ūd Ṣalāḥ al-Dīn Abū al-Muẓaffar Yūsuf ibn Muḥammad (‎; 1201–1229) was the sixth and final Ayyubid ruler of Yemen, from 1215 to 1229.

References

1201 births
1229 deaths
13th-century Ayyubid rulers
Ayyubid emirs of Yemen